Chiromyzinae is a subfamily of soldier flies in the family Stratiomyidae.

Genera

Archilagarinus Enderlein, 1932
Barbiellinia Bezzi, 1922
Boreoides Hardy, 1920
Chiromyza Wiedemann, 1820
Clavimyia Lindner, 1924
Hylorops Enderlein, 1921
Inopus Walker, 1850
Mapuchemyia Woodley, 2001
Mesomyza Enderlein, 1921
Nonacris Walker, 1850
Stenimantia Enderlein, 1932
Tana Reed, 1888

References

External links

 

Stratiomyidae
Taxa named by Friedrich Moritz Brauer
Brachycera subfamilies